The dance and theatre of Laos (nattakam Lao, Lao: ນາດຕະກັມລາວ ) is the primary dramatic art form of Laos' majority ethnic group, the Lao people. It is shared with the ethnic Lao that inhabit the Isan region of Thailand as well. There are mainly two types of dances (or dance-dramas), the classical dances performed in the royal courts and the folk dances now associated with morlam.

Shadow puppetry, although not associated with dance, is an important part of Lao theatrical traditions. Various dance-drama troupes, mostly operating out of Louang Phrabang and Vientiane, continue to teach the old classical court dances and more Khmer-influenced dramas and folk dances, respectively.

Classical dance and theatre
The dance-dramas of Laos were originally only performed for the royal court. The dance-dramas and musical accompaniment are all very similar to those of Thai and Cambodian classical dances. Lao legends of the first ruler of Lan Xang say that in addition to a large army of Khmer soldiers, he was also accompanied by many female dancers from the court of Angkor.

Most dance dramas depict scenes from the Phra Lak Phra Ram (ພຣະລັກພຣະຣາມ ), or the Lao Ramayana and the Sadok (ຊາດົກ ), or Jataka. Other scenes come from legends, historical epics such as Sin Xay , stories from local or Hindu mythology, or adaptations of stories from surrounding nations. Lao classical dance has two main forms, khone and lakhone. Each is accompanied by Lao classical music.

Khon (ໂຂນ ) is the most stylised of the Lao dance-dramas, with troupes of male and female dancers in elaborate costumes and masks performing very graceful movements demonstrating their great flexibility, and very common dance-drama form for the Phra Lak Phra Ram. Each dancer plays a character in the drama, although most of the narration comes from a singing chorus to the side. Lakhone (ລະຄອນ ) dances are usually only performed by females, but male lakhone dancers are not unknown. Instead of each dancer portraying an individual character, such as the Khon dance-dramas, the dancers mimic the scene and events together. There is more variety of dance-dramas performed in the Lakhon tradition.

Although lacking in dance, nang taloung or shadow puppets (ໜັງຕະລຸງ ) are an important part of Lao theatrical traditions. An adaptation of the traditional Malay wayang shadow puppets, but there are numerous puppeteers instead of one puppet master. Shadow puppet plays are based on similar themes and stories as the other classical dramas, but can be accompanied by either classical music or morlam instrumentation.

Lam lao

Lam Lao (ລຳລາວ) or morlam (ໝໍລຳ ) is the general descriptor for Lao folk music, which at its most basic level consists of the singer/story-teller and the khene (ແຄນ ). In Isan, both terms are interchangeable, but in Laos, morlam only refers to the singer. Troupes travel around like minstrels performing at various locales. There are many regional styles, depending on the local tone contours and preferred instrumentation and melodies.

The music that accompanies a lam lao performance may also include various types of percussion, fiddles, lutes, xylophones, or oboes as well as some that are more characteristic of classical ensembles. Lyrics are drawn from old poetry, classical stories, or improvised according to the complicated tonal rhyming patterns of the verse and can range from topics as serious as religious sermons and Jataka tales to sometimes bawdy verses about love and sex.

Although the performances themselves are not necessarily theatrical, the closest being the exchanges of witty repartées in alternating verses or songs between a male and a female morlam who pretend to fall in love before departing or friends who try to outwit each other. The songs are interspersed with dance numbers, comedic routines, ham acting, and teasing between the performers and the audience.

Folk dance
 
Lao folk dances (ຟ້ອນລຳພື້ນເມືອງ ) are numerous and varied, much like lam lao. In fact, most lam also have an associated folk dance. And Other popular dances include the southern lam Tang Vai (ລຳຕັງຫວາຽ ) and Lam Saravane (ລຳສາຣະວັນ ).

The most popular folk dance, however, is the lam vong (ລຳວົງ ). It is the national dance of Laos, and versions of it exist throughout the Lao-speaking region and even Cambodia, where it is known as ramvong. A slow and graceful couples dance, the men form an inner circle and the women an outer circle, with couples dancing around each other while moving in their respective circles.  It is a common feature of weddings, celebrations, and other social events.

Lam luang (likay lao)
A truly theatrical derivative of morlam, it is believed to have developed when the morlam began to dress up and act out various characters from the sung repertoire of oral traditions, myths and legends.it is better known as Lam Luang (ລຳເຣື່ອງ ) or sung story. Stories range from traditional to lewd, serious to bawdy, and are drawn from a diverse range of sources, such as the traditional stories and Jataka tales to even development projects and community concerns. Music can be classical, morlam, or even modern, and costumes also run the gamut depending on the needs of the story.

Common to Lam Luang theatre performances are stock characters common to all stories. These include the hero (ພຣະເອກ ), the heroine (ນາງເອກ ), king father, queen mother, clown, villain (ຜູ້ຮ້າຽ ), and supernatural forces such as gods, demons, spirits, or ogres.

References

Laotian art
Laotian culture
Laos